Dale Jonathan Winton (22 May 1955 – 18 April 2018) was an English radio DJ and television presenter.  He presented the shows Dale's Supermarket Sweep from 1993 until 2001 and again in 2007, the National Lottery game show In It to Win It between 2002 and 2016 and the 2008 series of Hole in the Wall. Winton also presented Pets Win Prizes (1995–96) and The Other Half (1997–2002).

Early life
Winton was born on 22 May 1955 to a Jewish father, Gary Winton, and actress Sheree Winton, a Jewish convert. Winton's father died on the day of his bar mitzvah and so he was brought up by his mother. Winton's mother died by suicide in 1976 while suffering from depression.

Career

Radio
Winton started DJing in clubs in Richmond in 1972, where he met Steve Allen, the LBC radio presenter. The two remained friends thereafter, and lived together for a period as well as going on holiday together. From there he had a selection of jobs including selling timeshares. In 1982, Winton moved to London and began his entertainment career on the London club circuit, where he DJ'd at weekends. This led him to the United Biscuits Radio Network where he did a variety of jobs working for Adrian Love, before getting his own morning show. From here he joined Radio Trent in Nottingham, where he presented a weekend show, moving to the weekday mid-morning show, before leaving in 1985, and going on to work at a number of other local radio stations including Chiltern Radio, Beacon Radio (in Wolverhampton, for 3 years) as well as Blue Danube Radio in Vienna, Austria.

In 2000, Winton took over from Alan Freeman to present Pick of the Pops on BBC Radio 2, and hosted the show until 30 October 2010, when Tony Blackburn replaced him. Winton sat in for Steve Wright and Liza Tarbuck on BBC Radio 2, covering the latter's Saturday show in September 2013 and November/December 2016.

Television
Winton began his television career in 1986 on Pet Watch, before working for Channel 4, Lifestyle Channel and ITV. From 1993 to 2000, he hosted Dale's Supermarket Sweep during the daytime TV period on ITV. In 2007, Supermarket Sweep was revived after a -year absence. Winton portrayed himself as an irritating game show presenter in Danny Boyle's 1996 film Trainspotting.

In 1995–96, Winton presented BBC's Saturday night game show Pets Win Prizes. In 1997, he presented the final of The Great British Song Contest, the UK's national selection for the Eurovision Song Contest, due to a tie-in with the lottery programme. Between that year and 2002, he also presented a dating show called The Other Half. In 1999, he appeared on the sitcom Gimme Gimme Gimme with Kathy Burke in the episode Do They Take Sugar?.

In 2000 he presented Barbara Windsor - Hall Of Fame 2000 TV Special, the  induction of Barbara Windsor as the first artist to be inducted into the newly created BBC Hall of Fame.

He was the subject of This Is Your Life in 2000 when he was surprised by Michael Aspel. In 2001, he presented Channel 5's endurance show Touch the Truck. In 2002, Winton began presenting the National Lottery game show In It to Win It. In 2003, he appeared in the BBC Three mockumentary, Dale's Wedding, in which he supposedly married the UK celebrity Nell McAndrew.

From 2003–04, he hosted two series of Stars Reunited where the casts of popular British television series were reunited after many years. Between 2004 and 2006, he presented three series of the celebrity weight loss "boot camp" programme, Celebrity Fit Club on ITV.

Winton presented BBC One's Saturday night entertainment programme Hole In The Wall in 2008, based on the Japanese original, where contestants in skin-tight lycra costumes contorted themselves to fit through oddly-shaped holes in a moving wall. The show returned for a second series in 2009 but Anton du Beke replaced Winton as host. Winton began appearing in television advertisements for cashmygold.co.uk in 2010. Winton appeared on Matt Lucas and David Walliams' BBC comedy series Come Fly With Me. He appeared in the last episode of the series, playing himself. In 2012, he hosted one-off ITV game show Dale's Great Getaway and in February 2018, Winton hosted travelogue series Dale Winton's Florida Fly Drive aired on Channel 5.

Personal life and death
In 2002, Winton released his autobiography in which he wrote about his rise to fame and his actress mother's suicide, and came out as homosexual. Winton endorsed US Presidential candidate Donald Trump during the 2016 US Presidential election. 

On 18 April 2018, Jan Kennedy, Winton's long-term agent, announced that Winton had died at his home. On 19 April a spokesman for Scotland Yard said that police were treating the death as "unexplained" but did not believe it to be suspicious. According to his friend Gloria Hunniford: "Dale had a lot of things going wrong, he had pain with arthritis, he had a heart complaint, he had a chest infection, and we all know how the winter affected that. He had asthma as well." The coroner concluded that Winton died of natural causes. Winton had recently moved from a £2.9 million apartment in Regent's Park to a property in Whetstone, North London. Winton's friends celebrated his life with a non-religious humanist funeral ceremony from Humanists UK on 22 May 2018, his birthday. His eulogy was preserved as part of a public historical archive of humanist funerals.

References

External links
 Podcast Interview with Dale Winton
 
 Dale Winton at the British Film Institute

1955 births
2018 deaths
English game show hosts
English humanists
English radio DJs
English television presenters
LGBT DJs
LGBT Jews
English gay actors
Male actors from London
BBC Radio 2 presenters
Jewish entertainers
Jewish humanists
People from Marylebone
People educated at Aldenham School
British LGBT broadcasters
English Jews
English autobiographers
21st-century English LGBT people